Japanese Air Force may refer to:
Japan Air Self-Defense Force (from 1954)
Imperial Japanese Army Air Force (1912–1945)
Imperial Japanese Naval Air Service (1912–1945)